θ Librae, Latinised as Theta Librae, is a single star in the southern zodiac constellation of Libra, near the constellation border with Scorpius. It is visible to the naked eye as a faint, orange-hued star with an apparent visual magnitude of 4.14. The distance to this star is approximately 168 light years, as determined by parallax, and it is drifting further away with a radial velocity of 5 km/s. The position of this star near the ecliptic means it is subject to lunar occultations.

This object is an aging giant star with a stellar classification of G9IIIb. Having exhausted the supply of hydrogen at its core, it has cooled and expanded; at present it has 12.3 times the girth of the Sun. The star has an estimated mass about 47% greater than the Sun. It is probably on the red giant branch, which indicates it is generating energy through hydrogen fusion in a shell outside an inert helium core. However, there is a 41% chance that it is a red clump giant on the horizontal branch, which would mean it was somewhat older and less massive. It has sometimes been classified spectroscopically as a subgiant, but detailed study shows that it is too cool and luminous to be on the subgiant branch.

References

G-type giants
Horizontal-branch stars

Libra (constellation)
Librae, Theta
Durchmusterung objects
Librae, 46
142198
077853
5908